Northwich Rowing Club is a rowing club on the River Weaver, based at the Crescent, Riverside, Northwich, Cheshire.

History
The club was founded in 1875 at the Crown and Anchor Hotel with the original boathouse being located on Lock Street, Winnington Bank. In 1907 the club moved to the Riversdale Estate before moving to its present location during the 1960s. Women were allowed to join as members in 1975 and in 1996 the club became part of the Project Oarsome Scheme.

Notable members
Adrienne Grimsditch
Matt Langridge

Honours

British champions

References

Sport in Cheshire
Rowing clubs in England
Northwich